Even Dwarfs Started Small is a 1970 West German absurdist comedy-drama film written, produced, and directed by Werner Herzog.

Plot
Dwarfs confined in an institution on a remote island rebel against the guards and director, also dwarfs, in a display of mayhem. They gleefully break windows and dishes, cackle maniacally, abandon a running truck to drive itself in circles, engineer food fights and cock fights, look at pin-up magazines, set fire to pots of flowers, kill a large pig, torment some blind dwarfs, and perform a mock crucifixion of a monkey.

Cast
 Helmut Döring as Hombré
 Paul Glauer as Erzieher
 Gisela Hertwig as Pobrecita
 Hertel Minkner as Chicklets
 Gertrud Piccini as Piccini
 Marianne Saar as Theresa
 Brigitte Saar as Cochina
 Gerd Gickel as Pepe
 Erna Gschwendtner as Azucar

Production
The film was shot on the Canary Islands, at Lanzarote. The film was produced during the same time period as Herzog's Fata Morgana and The Flying Doctors of East Africa, and there are visual and thematic connections between the three works. Notably, the goggles worn by the blind dwarfs are the same style as the goggles which several people wear in Fata Morgana.

During the filming, Herzog gave some strange direction to elicit particular performances from the actors. In directing one dwarf who continually struggled not to laugh, Herzog repeatedly told the actor that he must not laugh, but then made funny faces at him as soon as he started filming.

While filming the scene where a van drives in circles with no one at the wheel, one of the actors was run over, but immediately stood up uninjured. During the flower burning scene, the same actor caught fire and Werner Herzog raced over and beat the fire out. The actor only had minor injuries from the fire. After these two accidents, Herzog promised the actors that if they made it through the rest of filming without any more injuries he would jump into a cactus patch and allow the actors to film him doing so. The film was finished without any further injuries and the director made good his promise and dived into the cacti. Herzog has said, "Getting out was a lot more difficult than jumping in." The vehicle-in-circles scene was inspired by an incident that occurred when Herzog worked as a steward at the Munich Oktoberfest as a young man. Part of his duty was ensuring that drunk patrons did not attempt to drive their cars home, so when a drunk man insisted that he was capable of driving, Herzog got into his car with him, placed the steering wheel on full lock, then got out of his car. The man passed out and the car continued to drive in a circle until it ran out of petrol. This situation was repeated at the end Herzog's 1977 film Stroszek where Stroszek abandons the truck, on fire, circling the parking lot of a roadside amusement park before he kills himself aboard a ski-lift.

Reception
Even Dwarfs Started Small has a 100% approval rating on Rotten Tomatoes.

References

External links
 
 

1970 films
1970s avant-garde and experimental films
1970 comedy-drama films
West German films
German avant-garde and experimental films
German comedy-drama films
1970 independent films
1970s German-language films
Films directed by Werner Herzog
Cruelty to animals
Films set in psychiatric hospitals
German independent films
Films set on islands
Films shot in the Canary Islands
Works about dwarfism
1970 comedy films
1970 drama films
Cockfighting in film
1970s German films
Films about disability